Norman Atkinson Russell (born 7 August 1942) is a British clergyman who was the Archdeacon of Berkshire until Easter 2013. His retirement service was Sunday 12 May 2013

Biography

Russell was born in 1942 and educated at the Royal Belfast Academical Institution and Churchill College, Cambridge. After an earlier career as an accountant he was ordained in 1971. He  began his ministry with curacies at Christ Church with Emmanuel, Clifton, Bristol and Christ Church, Cockfosters. He was Rector of Harwell with Chilton, Oxfordshire from 1977 to 1984 and then Priest in charge at St James, Gerrards Cross. Later he was Rural Dean of Amersham and after his appointment as Archdeacon Prolocutor of the  Lower house of the Convocation of Canterbury.

Current Honorary research fellow at St Stephen's House, Oxford.

References

1943 births
People educated at the Royal Belfast Academical Institution
Alumni of Churchill College, Cambridge
Archdeacons of Berkshire
Living people